Duke's in Bed is an album recorded by American jazz saxophonist Johnny Hodges with members of the Duke Ellington Orchestra featuring performances recorded in 1956 and released on the Verve label. All arrangements were done by Billy Strayhorn.

Reception

The Allmusic site awarded the album 3 stars.

Track listing
All compositions by Johnny Hodges except as indicated
 "A-Oodie-Oobie" – 3:31
 "Meet Mr. Rabbit" – 7:16
 "Duke's in Bed" (Duke Ellington) – 2:53
 "Just Squeeze Me" (Ellington, Lee Gaines) – 3:07
 "Ballad for the Very Tired and Very Sad Lotus Eaters" (Billy Strayhorn) – 3:21
 "Confab with Rab" – 3:17
 "It Had to Be You" (Isham Jones, Gus Kahn) – 3:06 	
 "Black and Tan Fantasy" (Ellington, Bubber Miley) – 6:21
 "Take the "A" Train" (Strayhorn) – 8:02

Personnel
Johnny Hodges – alto saxophone
Clark Terry – trumpet
Ray Nance – trumpet, violin, vocals
Quentin Jackson – trombone
Jimmy Hamilton – clarinet, tenor saxophone
Harry Carney – baritone saxophone
Billy Strayhorn – piano
Jimmy Woode – bass
Sam Woodyard – drums

References

Johnny Hodges albums
1957 albums
Verve Records albums
Albums produced by Norman Granz